Botryosphaeria viticola is a fungus species in the genus Botryosphaeria responsible for a grapevine trunk disease. This species has a Dothiorella anamorph. It has been isolated from pruned canes of Vitis vinifera cv. Garnatxa Negra in Catalonia, Spain.

References

External links 
 Index Fungorum

viticola
Fungi described in 2006
Grapevine trunk diseases